Your Body may refer to:

 "Your Body" (Christina Aguilera song), 2012
 "Your Body" (Pretty Ricky song), 2005
 "Your Body", a song by Keith Urban from Ripcord, 2016
 "Your Body", a song by Kylie Minogue and Fernando Garibay, featuring Giorgio Moroder, from Kylie + Garibay, 2015
 "Your Body", a song by Tom Novy, 2004

See also
 Human body
 Body (disambiguation)